Ma Zhencheng (born March 1934) is a Chinese translator. He is the first person in China to translate The Little Prince, and was also praised as the best translator of The Little Prince. He also translated some of the works of the French novelists Michel de Montaigne, Milan Kundera, André Gide, and Marguerite Duras into Chinese.

Biography
Ma was born in Shanghai, in March 1934. He graduated from Nanjing University, where he majored in French language and literature. After university, he taught at Beijing Institute of Light Industry (now Beijing Technology and Business University). After the Cultural Revolution, he taught at Shanghai Second Medical University (now Shanghai Jiao Tong University School of Medicine) successively. In 1980, he began translating French literary works. In 1990, at the age of 56, he pursued advanced studies in France.

Translations
 Montaigne essays Complete Works (3 volumes)
 The Little Prince
 The Song of Roland
 Slowness
 The Festival of Insignificance
 Wonderful Events on Beautiful Valley Street
 La Symphonie pastorale
 Strait is the Gate
 Limonov

 Truck
 Tarquinian Pony
 Noanoa
 Witch: Satan's Lover
 Skota's Sun

Awards
  Limonov (Emmanuel Carrère) - Fu Lei Prize for Translation and Publishing, 2017.

References

External links

1934 births
Living people
People from Shanghai
Academic staff of Beijing Technology and Business University
Academic staff of Shanghai Jiao Tong University
Nanjing University alumni
French–Chinese translators